Adrian Frank Furnham (born 3 February 1953) is a South African-born British BPS chartered occupational psychologist and chartered health psychologist. He is currently an adjunct professor at BI Norwegian Business School and professor at University College London. Throughout his career, he has lectured in the following post-secondary institutions: Pembroke College, Oxford, University of New South Wales, University of West Indies, Hong Kong University Business School, and the Henley Management College.

Furnham has a broad range research interest within the field of psychology. He has explored topics within: applied, economic, health, occupational, social, and differential psychology. As of 2018, he has published 92 books and over 1,200 peer-reviewed journal articles.

Furnham is a fellow of the British Psychological Society; he was granted the British Psychological Society of Academic Contribution to Practice Award in 2011.

Early life 
Furnham was born on 3 February 1953 of British parents. He grew up in his birthplace Port Shepstone, Union of South Africa, where he was exposed to many people of different national origins. He was the only child of his parents. His father was a newspaper printer and publisher, while his mother was a nurse.

Growing up, Furnham came to discover traits of his that were not shared by his parents. He found himself to be ambitious, striving for academic and financial success at a young age. On the other hand, his parents had no such ambitions for themselves. He was opened to new and exotic experience, unlike his parents, who were not eager with exploring things outside of the Anglo-Saxon culture. His parents were satisfied with a shallow understanding of things, while Furnham would crave for a deep level of understanding.

Education
Adrian completed in total one undergraduate degree, three master's degrees and three doctorates. In 1970, at the age of sixteen, he began his university education at the University of Natal (Pietermaritzburg campus), completing a Bachelor of Arts degree in 1972, and an Honours Bachelor of Arts degree in 1973. His academic studies focused on history, psychology, and theology. He then went on to complete a Master of Arts in 1974, composing his thesis on "Cross-cultural conformity and field dependence". In 1975 he proceeded to complete an economics master's degree at the University of London, focusing his research, essays, and examinations on his thesis: "The relative contribution of verbal, vocal, and visual cues to person perception". Furthering his education, he completed a Master of Science at the University of Strathclyde, completing research on "Sex and class factors in the perception of social episodes". From there, in 1981 Furnham completed a doctorate at Oxford and later received a D.Sc. from London in 1991 and a D.Litt. from Natal in 1997.

Educators 
Throughout his education, Furnham had many great educators who had a positive influence on his life, but two of them particularly notable.

The first is Michael Argyle (11 August 1925 – 6 September 2002), who was Furnham's PhD supervisor. Argyle wrote approximately 250 papers on a number of different topics including body language, religion, money, happiness, and work. At one point, he was the fourth most cited British Psychologist. According to Furnham, there are many things that are unique about Argyle. One thing that stood out to Furnham in particular is that Argyle advised his Doctorate students not too read too much about an idea initially as it would limit their creativity and thinking. A significant impact that he had on Furnham's career is that he taught him not to be afraid to explore new areas of research, and not limit himself to already existing fields. Furnham also learned from Argyle the characteristics of a good doctoral supervisor, to be cooperative with colleagues, and to work hard and play hard.

The second is Hans Eysenck (4 March 1916 – 4 September 1997), who was Furnham's role model. Eysenck was the living psychologist most frequently cited in the peer-reviewed scientific journal literature in 1997. Furnham met Eysenck while doing his PhD. He was one of the first theorists to advocate a biologically based theory of personality. Furnham became an Eysenckian after reading his books and papers, and started using his psychometric tests during his PhD. In 2008, Furnham wrote a paper suggesting five reasons why Eysenck's tests have remained popular for a long time. He suggested that these reasons are: parsimony, explanation of process, experimentation, wide application, and continuous improvement and development.

Career 

Adrian Furnham is currently a professor of psychology at University College London. Before his current placement, he had previously lectured at numerous institutes, including: Pembroke College, Oxford, University of New South Wales, and the University of West Indies. More so, he also taught management at both the Hong Kong University Business school as well as the Henley Management College. In 2009, he was assigned a position of adjunct professor of management at the Norwegian School of Management.

Furnham has been recognized as a Chartered Occupational Psychologist. In addition to his professor roles at several universities, Furnham is an active member of many different associations. He is a Fellow of the British Psychological Society, as he was renown to be the second most productive psychologist in 1995.  He is also currently the elected president of the International Society for the Study of Individual Differences, as well as the founder and director of Applied Behavioural Research Associates (ABRA); which is a consultancy in psychology. Furnham's work was used at universities and other associations. He also proactively consulted for many international companies to assist them with top team development, create systems for performance management, psychometric testing and developing leadership skills. Following these experiences, he was elected Fellow of the Leadership Trust in 2010, Academician of the Learned Society of the Social Sciences in 2010, and British Psychological Society of Academic Contribution to Practice Award in 2011.

He has written over 70 books, and many of them have been translated into different languages, including Chinese, French, German, Italian, Japanese, Korean, Polish, Russian, Portuguese, and Spanish. Alongside his books, Furnham has written newspaper pieces for Financial Times, Guardian, Telegraph, Daily Mail, Times Higher Educational Supplement, Sunday Times, and contributed to various magazines, including: The Spectator, Personnel Management, New Scientist, Across the Board, and Spotlight, in both Europe and North America. He has been a columnist in multiple management magazines such as Mastering Management and Human Resources. He is also a regular contributor to national and international radio and television channels such as BBC, CNN, and ITV.

Research

Contributions 
Furnham reports being uncertain as to what type of psychologist he is as he is interested in a multiple topics. He has been labelled an applied, differential, economic, health, occupational, and social psychologist at different times. However, he is a British Psychological Society chartered occupational and a chartered health psychologist. He believes that his personality and upbringing has resulted in his curiosity about a variety of issues within and outside the discipline, hence the diversity in his interdisciplinary work.

Themes

Psychometric housekeeping and reviews 
Furnham has an interest in documenting different scales that measure the same thing and comparing their quantities. He has done this through reviewing old and new personality tests. These are critical reviews which are comprehensive, extensively quoted, and are updated occasionally. Some examples of his extensive reviews are Tolerance of Ambiguity (co-authored by Ribchester and Marks), Belief in a Just World, and the Protestant Work Ethic.

Test development 
Furnham has developed several tests throughout his career. He adapted already existing ideas to make specific tests like the Economic Locus of Control measure in 1986, and the Organisational Attributional Style Questionnaire in 1992. He developed the Trait Emotional Intelligence Questionnaire, which is a self-report inventory that measures the sampling domain of trait emotional intelligence, along with his PhD student Dino Petrides in 2006. He also developed the High Flyer Trait Inventory (formerly High Flying Personality Inventory), with his colleague Ian Macrae in 2014. The High Flyer Trait Inventory is a measure of personality traits directly related to workplace behaviours, thoughts, and perceptions of oneself and others.

The relationship between tests of preference and power 
To this day Furnham had been interested in the distant relationship between the two pillars differential psychology. Furnham had given his opinion on this topic to the International Society for the Study of Individual differences. He works on this topic with the help of his PhD students.

Self-appraisal and awareness 
Beginning early on Furnham took a great interest in self-awareness and self-estimating intelligence, in which he published many studies on. The findings of his studies revealed that males tend to estimate their general intelligence 5-15 IQ points higher than females do, these sex differences occur across the generations and that sex differences are cross-culturally consistent.

Dark side 
Furnham was introduced to the dark side personality by Robert Hogan. Dark side personalities are those that portray dysfunctional behaviours and beliefs towards others. For instance, Psychopaths would fall under this category. These types of people do not consider how their actions affect their reputation, and, although this may seem like deviant behaviour, it also seems to help them people climb up the corporate ladder. Dark side personality research was based on the DSM-III. Using the Hogan Development Survey in various studies, Furnham was able to collect sufficient amounts of data, which later on aided in studying misbehaviour at work. According to the HDS, mischievous people were considered to be extraverts, disagreeable, deliberate, and stable. They scored high on the excitement scale and low on the consciousness scale. Furnham has written multiple papers as well as two books on this topic.

Publications

Books 
As of 2019, he has written over 92 books and over 1200 scientific papers, including:

 1990 The Protestant Work Ethic
 1994 Culture Shock
 1994 Personality at Work
 1995 The New Economic Mind
 1996 The Myths of Management
 1997 The Psychology of Behaviour at Work
 1998 The Psychology of Money
 2003 The Incompetent Manager
 2004 The Dark Side of Behaviour at Work
 2005 The People Business
 2006 Management Mumbo-Jumbo
 2007 Head and Heart Management
 2008 Management Intelligence
 2009 50 Psychology Ideas you really need to know
 2009 The Elephant in the Boardroom: The Psychology of Leadership Derailment
 2012 The Talented Manager
 2015 High Potential
 2017 Motivation and Performance

Awards and achievements 

 2010 Elected Fellow of the Leadership Trust
 2010 Elected Academician of the Learned Society of the Social Sciences
 2011 British Psychological Society Academic Contribution to Practice Award
 2017 Lifetime Achievement Award

References 

1953 births
Living people
People from Port Shepstone
University of Natal alumni
British business theorists
British psychologists
Alumni of the University of London
Alumni of the University of Strathclyde
Alumni of Wolfson College, Oxford
Academics of the University of Oxford
Academics of University College London
Academic staff of the University of Hong Kong
South African emigrants to the United Kingdom
People associated with The Institute for Cultural Research